KZ1 is a kart racing class using 125 cc water-cooled two-stroke engines yielding approximately , equipped with a six-speed gearbox. KZ1 is the fastest of the KZ karting racing categories, and technical regulations are similar to KZ2 except that KZ1 allows for the gearbox to be either manual or electro-mechanical as well as the wise use of soft tires. Both engines and chassis must be approved by the CIK-FIA racing governing commission. It is open to top drivers aged 15 and over. They can accelerate from 0-100 km/h in 3 seconds.

This class used to be called Formula C. It was discontinued in favor of Super ICC and renamed KZ1 by the CIK-FIA in January 2007.

There is a European KZ1 Championship and a World Cup, both organized under CIK-FIA.

CIK-FIA Karting World Champions

* indicate World Cup, which replaced the World Championship from 2000-2012

CIK-FIA Karting European Champions

See also
 KF1, the top level of karting
 KF2, a KF1 feeder series
 KF3, a KF2 and KF1 feeder series
 KZ2, the second fastest KZ karting racing category
 Superkart, road racing with kart sized open-wheel cars

References

External links
 CIK-FIA website

Kart racing series